Si Phanom Mat, also spelled Sriphanommas and Sripanommas, is a village and tambon (sub-district) of Laplae District, in Uttaradit Province, Thailand. In 2005 it had a population of 3,276 people.

References

External links 
 Thesaban tambon Si Phanom Mat 

Tambon of Uttaradit province
Populated places in Uttaradit province